Springvale Airport, Queensland  is an airport near Springvale, Queensland.

See also
 List of airports in Queensland

References

External links
Springvale Airport on TheAirDB

Airports in Queensland
Central West Queensland